Nicrophorus mongolicus is a burying beetle described by Shchegoleva-Barovskaya in 1933.

References

Silphidae
Beetles of North America
Beetles described in 1933